The 2006 Team Speedway Junior World Championship was the second of the FIM Team Speedway Junior World Championship season. The final took place in Germany, Sweden and Poland in June and September 2006. World Championship was won by Poland team.

Qualification

Semifinal 1

Semifinal 2
June 17, 2006
 Kumla

Final
September 17, 2006
 Rybnik

References

See also
2006 Speedway World Cup

2006
World T J